Garlin is an unincorporated community in Adair County, Kentucky, United States.  Its elevation is 892 feet (272 m).

History
A post office was established in the community in 1903, and probably named for its first postmaster.

References

Unincorporated communities in Adair County, Kentucky
Unincorporated communities in Kentucky